is a subway station in Taitō, Tokyo, Japan, operated by the Tokyo subway operator Toei Subway. It is numbered E-09.

Lines
Ueno-okachimachi Station is served by the Toei Ōedo Line. The station provides transfers to:

●Okachimachi Station on the Yamanote Line

●Ueno-hirokōji Station on the Tokyo Metro Ginza Line

●Naka-Okachimachi Station on the Tokyo Metro Hibiya Line.

Platforms
The station consists of an island platform serving two tracks.

History
Ueno-okachimachi Station opened on 12 December 2000.

References

External links

 Toei station information 

Railway stations in Japan opened in 2000
Stations of Tokyo Metropolitan Bureau of Transportation
Toei Ōedo Line
Railway stations in Tokyo